DCK may refer to:
DCK (Buckethead album), 2007 album by Buckethead using the name Death Cube K
Deschloroketamine, a dissociative anesthetic drug
Deoxycytidine kinase, an enzyme
DHA City, Karachi, a planned city in Karachi, Pakistan